is a former Japanese football player.

Club career
Masuyama was born in Minokamo on January 25, 1990. After graduating from high school, he joined JEF United Chiba in 2008. However he could hardly play in the match, he moved to Oita Trinita in August 2010. He returned to JEF United in 2011 and he moved to Matsumoto Yamaga FC in 2012. He moved to his local club FC Gifu in 2013. He became a regular player as defensive midfielder. His opportunity to play decreased in 2016 and he retired end of 2016 season.

National team career
In August 2007, Masuyama was elected Japan U-17 national team for 2007 U-17 World Cup, but he did not play in the match.

Club statistics

References

External links

1990 births
Living people
Association football people from Gifu Prefecture
Japanese footballers
J1 League players
J2 League players
JEF United Chiba players
Oita Trinita players
Matsumoto Yamaga FC players
FC Gifu players
Association football midfielders